Sphoeroides kendalli, known as the slick puffer, is a species of pufferfish in the family Tetraodontidae. It is native to the Eastern Pacific, where it ranges from Costa Rica to Talara, Peru. It is a demersal species found in shallow coastal areas that reaches 18 cm (7 inches) in total length.

References 

Tetraodontidae
Fish described in 1928